Coolio.com is the fourth studio album by American rapper Coolio. The album was released exclusively in Japan on April 18, 2001, on JVC Victor Records. The songs "I Like Girls", "Gangbangers", "Show Me Love", "Would You Still Be Mine", "Skirrrrrrrt" and "Ghetto Square Dance" would later appear on Coolio's 2002 album El Cool Magnifico.

Track listing

Coolio albums
2001 albums
Gangsta rap albums by American artists